Alexandrea Kawisenhawe Rice (born September 16, 1972) is an Aboriginal Canadian actress. She grew up in Brooklyn, New York. Rice is known for performances in The Twilight Saga (2008-2012) and in a series of PBS films adapted from the mystery novels of Tony Hillerman.

Early life
Rice was born September 16, 1972, into a Kanien'kehaka (Mohawk) family on the Kahnawake reserve in Quebec, and she is proud of her First Nations heritage. Through her father she is a member of the Rice family of Kahnawake, having descended from Edmund Rice, an early immigrant to Massachusetts Bay Colony. Two Rice boys were taken captive as children in 1704 from Massachusetts, and taken to Kahnawake, Quebec where they were adopted by Mohawk families and became assimilated. Alex is descended from Edmund Rice's great grandson, Silas, who took the name of Tookanowras, but he was also baptized as Catholic and known as Jacques Thanhohorens.

Born on the Kahnawake Mohawk reserve in Quebec, Canada, Rice spent the majority of her childhood with her family in Brooklyn, New York. Her father was among a community of Mohawk ironworkers, who settled in what is now Boerum Hill. The men worked on skyscrapers and bridges, and the women made community. The Mohawk called their neighborhood "Little Caughnawaga", after their homeland.

There Rice attended local schools and trained to become a professional dancer at local dance studios; she developed a passion for acting when she landed a part in an educational video produced at her grammar school. She attended Our Lady of Perpetual Help High School in Brooklyn. In 1990, after her father died and she graduated from high school, Alex and her mother Melody Rice moved back to Kanawake. She attended Dawson College and Concordia University in Montreal, where she majored in library science.

Career
Rice first traveled to California in 1996 to attend a modeling convention and landed her first entertainment job working behind the scenes at the Judge Judy show. Her first feature film was the independent The Doe Boy (2001), which garnered several international film festival awards. She is perhaps best known for her recurring role as Janet Pete in the films Skinwalkers (2002), Coyote Waits (2003), and A Thief of Time (2004), based on the Tony Hillerman novels by the same names. She has appeared in other films including Lewis & Clark: Great Journey West, On the Corner, A Thousand Roads, the IMAX release of Sacagawea, Johnny Tootall and The New World. She has also acted in various television series, including Spin City, CSI, Strong Medicine and The Sopranos.

Rice played Sue Clearwater in the third installment of The Twilight Saga: Eclipse released in 2010, and the fourth and fifth installments The Twilight Saga: Breaking Dawn - Part 1 released in 2011, and The Twilight Saga: Breaking Dawn – Part 2 released in 2012.

Filmography

Film

Television

Awards 
2003, Best Actress in the Motion Pictures Awards presented by the American Indian Film Institute, for her reprisal of Janet Pete in Coyote Waits.
2005, the First American Award for her work in A Thief In Time, presented by the First Americans in the Arts Committee.

References

External links

Living people
Dawson College alumni
Concordia University alumni
Canadian Mohawk people
American film actresses
American television actresses
Canadian film actresses
Canadian television actresses
First Nations actresses
People from Brooklyn
People from Montérégie
Actresses from Quebec
21st-century Canadian actresses
21st-century First Nations people
1972 births
Mohawks of Kahnawá:ke
21st-century American women